Pastuchov is a village and municipality in Hlohovec District in the Trnava Region of western Slovakia.

History
In historical records the village was first mentioned in 1275.

Geography
The municipality lies at an altitude of 200 metres and covers an area of 15.235 km². It has a population of about 975 people.

References

External links
https://web.archive.org/web/20071027094149/http://www.statistics.sk/mosmis/eng/run.html

Villages and municipalities in Hlohovec District